As Salaam Air is an airline based in Zanzibar, Tanzania, that offers private charters and scheduled operations in Tanzania.The airline is now operating with 2 embraer 120.

The company is leading airline flying between two spice islands Pemba and Unguja.

Destinations
Scheduled flights are operated to the following destinations within Tanzania:

Fleet
The As Salaam Air fleet consists of the following aircraft (as of November 2020):

References

External links
Company Facebook

Airlines of Tanzania
Airlines established in 2013
2013 establishments in Tanzania